is a Japanese classical pianist. She was a finalist at the XVII International Chopin Piano Competition and won 4th prize at the subsequent XVIII International Chopin Piano Competition.

Biography

She was born in Ube, Yamaguchi Prefecture, and she lived there until February 2007 and later in Tokyo, started learning the piano at the age of three, played with an orchestra at age seven, and has been receiving tutelage from Yuko Ninomiya since the age of eight.

Kobayashi's awards include three Yamaguchi Prefecture "Glory Culture Prize" and the special Frédéric Chopin passport from the Polish government. She has performed in France, Brazil, Poland, Russia, South Korea, the United States, and Japan in venues such as the Salle Cortot (Paris), Svetlanov Hall (Moscow), Suntory Hall (Japan), and all three halls of the Carnegie Hall Complex (New York City). AADGT (the American Association for Development of the Gifted and Talented), a New York-based non-profit organization, has supported Kobayashi for many years.

In 2010, Kobayashi released her CD/DVD debut, Aimi Kobayashi Debut, followed by another CD, Passion, for EMI Classics Japan. In 2011, she made her acting debut in the Japanese film Sleep directed by Katsumi Sakaguchi. Kobayashi's management company is To-On Artist's Promotion Agency, and she is currently a student at the Curtis Institute of Music.

She has released three further CDs, two of which exclusively feature music composed by Chopin, and one with music by both Chopin and Franz Liszt.

In 2015, she was a finalist at the XVII International Chopin Piano Competition.

In 2021, she placed 4th, ex aequo, at the XVIII International Chopin Piano Competition.

On January 1, 2023, she married Kyohei Sorita, a childhood friend and fellow laureate of the XVIII Chopin Piano Competition. They have announced that they are also expecting a child.

References

External links 
 Aimi Kobayashi | KAJIMOTO
 Aimi Kobayashi | Warner Music Japan Inc.

1995 births
Living people
Japanese pianists
Japanese women pianists
Japanese classical pianists
Musicians from Yamaguchi Prefecture
Women classical pianists
21st-century Japanese women musicians
21st-century classical pianists
Prize-winners of the International Chopin Piano Competition
21st-century women pianists